Get Down or Lay Down is the debut album by Philly's Most Wanted, released on August 7, 2001 through Atlantic Records. The majority of the album was produced by The Neptunes.

The album featured three charting singles, the most successful of which was "Cross the Border", which peaked at 98 on the Billboard Hot 100 and 3 on the Billboard Hot Rap Singles. "Y'all Can't Never Hurt Us" and "Please Don't Mind" both found success on the Rap charts, reaching 13 and 12 on the chart respectively. The album itself, however, underperformed, only reaching 69 on the Billboard 200.

Track listing

Charts

References

2001 debut albums
Atlantic Records albums
Albums produced by the Neptunes
Albums produced by Just Blaze
Hip hop albums by American artists